South Carolina Highway 262 (SC 262) is a  primary state highway in the U.S. state of South Carolina. It serves primarily as the southern border of Fort Jackson.

Route description

Starting from Garners Ferry Road, U.S. Route 76 (US 76) and US 378, it connects with Interstate 77 (I-77) before continuing on a relatively straight two-lane road to US 601.

History
Established in 1937 or 1938 as a new primary route going east, it started off as a  paved stub road, going east from US 76. In 1940, it was extended along a dirt road to US 601; which was later paved by 1942.  In 1948, it was briefly decommissioned, but reinstated a year later.  Since its inception, it has served as the southern boundary for Fort Jackson for its entire length.

Junction list

See also

References

External links

262
Transportation in Richland County, South Carolina
Transportation in Columbia, South Carolina